Karel Nedvěd was a Bohemian track and field athlete who competed at the 1900 Summer Olympics in Paris, France.

Nedvěd competed in the 400 metre hurdles, placing fifth of five overall.  He placed third in his semifinal heat to be the only hurdler not to qualify for the final in the event, due to the five-man field being divided into two semifinals of two and three competitors with the top two from each semifinal advancing.

References

External links 

 De Wael, Herman. Herman's Full Olympians: "Athletics 1900". Accessed 18 March 2006.
 

Athletes (track and field) at the 1900 Summer Olympics
Olympic athletes of Bohemia
Year of birth missing
Year of death missing
Czech male hurdlers
Place of birth missing
Place of death missing